Nationality words link to articles with information on the nation's poetry or literature (for instance, Irish or France).

Events
 May 23 – The Battle of Ramillies, a victory for the British and their allies under John Churchill, 1st Duke of Marlborough, inspires several poets.

Works published
 Joseph Addison, The Campaign, on the victory at Blenheim
 Daniel Baker, The History of Job
 Sir Richard Blackmore, Advice to the Poets, published anonymously
 Stephen Clay, An Epistle from the Elector of Bavaria to the French King: After the Battel of Ramilles, published anonymously; has been misattributed to Matthew Prior
 William Congreve:
 A Pindarique Ode ... On the Victorious Progress of Her Magesties Arms, Under the Conduct of the Duke of Marlborough
 Discourse on the Pindarique Ode, in which the author criticized Abraham Cowley's views
 Daniel Defoe:
 Caledonia
 Jure Divino, about the divine-right theory of monarchy
 John Dennis, The Battle of Ramilla; or, the Power of Union
 William Harison, Woodstock Park, London : printed for Jacob Tonson
 Nicholas Noyes, "On Cotton Mather's Endeavors Toward the Christian Education of Negro Slaves", English Colonial America
 John Philips:
 Blenheim
 Cerealia: An imitation of Milton, published anonymously, also attributed to Elijah Fenton
 Thomas Tickell, Oxford, published anonymously, published this year, although the book states "1707"
 James Watson, editor, A Choice Collection of Comic and Serious Scots Poems both ancient and modern, by several hands, Edinburgh (published this year through 1711)
 Isaac Watts - Horae Lyricae

Births
Death years link to the corresponding "[year] in poetry" article:
 Joseph Green (died 1780, English Colonial American clergyman and poet

Deaths
Birth years link to the corresponding "[year] in poetry" article:
 January 29 – Charles Sackville, 6th Earl of Dorset (born 1638), English poet and courtier
 June – Jacques Testu de Belval (born c. 1626), French ecclesiastic and poet
 November 15 (presumed) – Tsangyang Gyatso, 6th Dalai Lama (died 1683), deposed Buddhist religious leader and Tibetan poet
 December 3 – Emilie Juliane of Schwarzburg-Rudolstadt (born 1637), German countess and hymn writer
Also:
 Luo Mu (born 1622), Chinese painter, poet and prose writer
 John Phillips (born 1631), poet and satirist, brother of Edward Phillips, nephew of John Milton
 Rahman Baba (born 1632), Indian Pashto poet
 Susanna Elizabeth Zeidler (born 1657), German

See also

Poetry
List of years in poetry
List of years in literature

Notes

 "A Timeline of English Poetry" Web page of the Representative Poetry Online Web site, University of Toronto

18th-century poetry
Poetry